Alfred Jørgensen may refer to:

Alfred Frøkjær Jørgensen (1890–1973), Danish  gymnast at the 1920 Summer Olympics
Alfred Ollerup Jørgensen (1898–1988), Danish gymnast at the 1920 Summer Olympics